Inside Sahara is a large coffee-table style book containing pictures taken by Basil Pao, who was the stills photographer on the team that made the Sahara with Michael Palin TV program for the BBC.

Michael Palin's name is prominently displayed on the cover, and he has contributed a two-page Introduction.

The rest of the book consists of Basil Pao's photographs, each with a short text indicating what the picture is about and where it was taken. Some of the pictures are displayed as impressive two-page spreads. A majority of the pictures show the local people, some as informal portraits, some showing people engaged in various activities. The rest of the pictures are beautiful landscapes, many depicting the harsh yet fascinating desert.

The book is divided into the following 11 sections: Morocco, Algeria (West), Western Sahara, Mauritania, Senegal, Mali, Niger, Algeria (Centre), Libya, Tunisia and Algeria (North).

There is also a two-page foreword by Basil Pao, and there are 12 pages that contain 78 very small pictures that provide some insights into how the BBC film crew did their work.

External links 
Text and pictures can be viewed for free on Michael Palin's web site

Photographic collections and books
British travel books
2002 non-fiction books
Books about the Sahara
Weidenfeld & Nicolson books
English non-fiction books